The Sony Ericsson Xperia Mini Pro (model SK17i) is an Android smartphone from Sony Ericsson, released in August 2011. The Xperia Mini Pro has a "mobile BRAVIA engine" driving a 320×480 pixels  capacitive touch-screen, a 1 GHz Snapdragon S2 processor, a 5 megapixel camera, 512 MB of onboard RAM, a hardware keyboard and comes stock with a 2 GB microSD card (compatible with up to 32 GB).

Overview
The Xperia Mini Pro runs Android 4.0, "Ice Cream Sandwich." It was touted as being an ultra-small smartphone that still retained higher-end specifications and performance.

See also
 List of Android devices
 List of Xperia devices
 Galaxy Nexus

References

External links
 
 

Android (operating system) devices
Sony Ericsson smartphones
Mobile phones introduced in 2011

fr:Sony Ericsson Xperia Mini Pro
ja:S51SE
zh:Sony Ericsson Xperia mini pro